"Tracy" is a song written by Lee Pockriss and Paul Vance, the title track of their debut LP.

Background
The single was released in 1969 by The Cuff Links and featured Ron Dante on vocals. Dante recalled recording the vocals for "Tracy" stating, "I put on a lead voice, doubled it a few times, and then put about 16, 18 backgrounds."

Chart performance
The song spent 12 weeks on the Billboard Hot 100 chart, peaking at No. 9, while reaching No. 5 on Billboards Easy Listening chart, No. 4 on Record Worlds "100 Top Pops", No. 5 on the Cash Box Top 100, No. 1 on Canada's RPM 100, No. 4 on the UK Singles Chart, No. 4 on New Zealand's NZ Listener chart, and No. 9 on Australia's Go-Set chart.

Weekly singles charts

Year-end charts

References

External links
 

1969 songs
1969 singles
Songs written by Lee Pockriss
Songs written by Paul Vance
RPM Top Singles number-one singles
Decca Records singles